Route 15W or Highway 15W may refer to:
 Interstate 15W, two former designations in Idaho and California
 Georgia State Route 15W (former)
 K-15W (Kansas highway), now part of K-15

See also
List of highways numbered 15
List of highways numbered 15A
List of highways numbered 15E